Big Chief Henry's Indian String Band was a Choctaw Indian string band from Oklahoma, United States. The band was composed of members of the Hall family—Henry, father, on vocals and fiddle; and sons Clarence on guitar and Harold on banjo. They played from Wichita, Kansas.

H. C. Speir, a music promoter from Jackson, Mississippi, heard them playing at the Choctaw Indian Fair in Philadelphia, Mississippi. He got them a recording contract with RCA Victor, who recorded a number of songs in Dallas, October 14, 1929.

Discography
Original recording date October 14, 1929, Dallas.
{| border="2" cellspacing="0" cellpadding="4" rules="all" style="margin:1em 1em 1em 0; border-style:solid; border-width:1px; border-collapse:collapse; empty-cells:show;  "
|- bgcolor='#FFDEAD'
!Session
!Title
!Recording
|-
|BVE 56382-2
|Blue Bird Waltz
|V-40225
|-
|BVE 56383-2
|Choctaw Waltz
|V-40225
|-
|BVE 56384-2
|Indian Tom-Tom
|V-40281
|-
|BVE 56385-2
|The Indian's Dream
|V-40281
|-
|BVE 56386-2
|Cherokee Rag
|V-40195
|-
|BVE 56387-2
|On The Banks Of The Kaney
|V-40195
|}

References

Bibliography
Sisson, Richard; Christian K. Zacher; Andrew Robert Lee Cayton (eds.). The American Midwest: An Interpretive Encyclopedia. Indiana University Press, 2007. 
Spottswood, Richard K. Ethnic Music on Records: A Discography of Ethnic Recordings Produced in the United States, 1893-1942 & etc. (Vol. 5). University of Illinois Press. 1990. 
Wardlow, Gayle Dean. Chasin' That Devil Music: Searching for the Blues. Backbeat Books, 1998.

External links
Choctaw Indian Fair—Philadelphia, Mississippi.

Choctaw culture
Music of Oklahoma
Culture of the Western United States